Capparis acutifolia is a species of shrub in the family Capparaceae.  The recorded distribution includes India, China, and Indo-China.  It may be called cáp xoan ngược in Vietnam.

Subspecies
No subspecies are listed in the Catalogue of Life, but GRIN records:
 C. acutifolia subsp. acutifolia
 C. acutifolia subsp. bodinieri
 C. acutifolia subsp. viminea

References

External links 
 

acutifolia
Flora of Indo-China
Taxa named by Robert Sweet (botanist)